Little Baby's Ice Cream was an ice cream company based in Philadelphia.

History
The company began in 2011, selling ice cream from tricycles. A brick and mortar location opened in August 2012. The company received national attention for a 2012 commercial, "This is a Special Time", in which a person apparently made of ice cream uses a spoon to consume ice cream from their own head. (The actual substance used was marshmallow cream.) The company introduced pre-packaged ice cream pints in 2015 in containers similar to oyster pails.

The company had locations in Philadelphia, Washington D.C. and Baltimore. Along with pizza restaurant Pizza Brain, the company faced harassment from Pizzagate conspiracists.

In November 2019, Little Baby's permanently closed.

Products
The company was known for its specialty flavors, including Earl Grey Sriracha, Vanilla Cardamom Cream, and Pizza. In 2018, the company released a CBD-infused ice cream.

Little Baby's had collaborated on foods with many other Philadelphia-based companies: pizza-flavored ice cream with Pizza Brain, PYNK-flavored ice cream with Yards Brewing Company, and multiple collaborations with Federal Donuts.

References

2011 establishments in Pennsylvania
2019 disestablishments in Pennsylvania
Ice cream brands
Privately held companies based in Pennsylvania
Restaurants in Philadelphia